The 2001 FA Women's Charity Shield was the second Women's FA Community Shield, as with its male equivalent, the Community Shield is an annual football match played between the winners of the previous season's league and the previous season's Women's FA Cup. The match was contested between Arsenal and Doncaster Belles, Arsenal won 5-2.

References

Women's FA Community Shield
Community Shield
Community Shield
Community Shield
Community Shield
Community Shield